General Rodríguez is a city within the urban agglomeration of Greater Buenos Aires, Buenos Aires Province, Argentina. It is the administrative centre for General Rodríguez Partido. The triple crime took place in 2008. In 2013 AGCO opened a factory in General Rodríguez to build Massey Ferguson and Valtra tractors.

References

External links

 Municipal website
 La Posta news web site - Portal
 "El Vecinal" - A local FM Radio from the city
 Diario Acción newspaper

Populated places in Buenos Aires Province
General Rodríguez Partido
Cities in Argentina
Argentina